I Sing of a Well is a 2009 Ghanaian film directed by Leila Djansi. It stars Jimmy Jean-Louis, Jot Agyeman and Freeman Ekow.

Cast
Jot Agyeman as Prince Wenambe
Akofa Edjeani Asiedu
Samuel Annang as Elder
Edna Asare as Palace Maid
Comfort Bawa as Village Woman
Jerry Botwe as Announcer
Freeman Ekow as Omuaru
Jimmy Jean-Louis as Narrator

References

External links
I Sing of a Well at the Internet Movie Database

Best Screenplay Africa Movie Academy Award winners
Best Sound Africa Movie Academy Award winners
Best Costume Design Africa Movie Academy Award winners
Ghanaian drama films
2000s English-language films
English-language Ghanaian films
Films directed by Leila Djansi